Jeff Hamburg (born 1956) is an American  composer. Born in Philadelphia, he studied acoustics and composition at the University of Illinois and moved to the Netherlands in 1978 to continue his studies at the Royal Conservatory of The Hague with Louis Andriessen. In 1986, he received the Conservatory Prize. He further studied French Horn at the Royal Conservatory and later conducted classes with David Porcelijn at the Conservatory of Utrecht.

In 2002, Hamburg received the Visser-Neerlandia Music Prize for the outstanding quality of his oeuvre. From 2008 to 2015, Hamburg was chairman of the board of Geneco, the Dutch composer's guild.

His translation of The Apollonian Clockwork: On Stravinsky by Elmer Schönberger and Louis Andriessen is published by Oxford University Press.

Together with flutist Eleonore Pameijer, Hamburg started the Dutch cd label FutureClassics.

Selected works
Orchestral
 2009 Podolian Dances - string orchestra
 2007 Hear O Heavens - Give Ear, O Earth – symphony orchestra
 2007 The Wild Waters that Roar – symphony orchestra
 2004 Ruach - Concerto for Oboe and Orchestra
 2003 Kumi, Ori – tenor and orchestra
 2001 Aychah – choir and orchestra
 2001 Zachor – symphony orchestra
 2000 Concerto for flute and orchestra
 1998 Klezmania – chamber orchestra
 1996 A Prayer and a Dance – string orchestra
 1994 Zey… (Yiddish) – soprano and orchestra
 1988 Concertino – alto saxophone and orchestra
 1982 Symphony in Es (rev. 1994) – symphony orchestra
 1981 Towers and Bridges – flutes, copper and double bass

Chamber music
 2008 Sparkle - bassoon solo
 2007 Jubel – oboe, harp
 2007 Kaddish – baritone, oboe, cello, harp
 2006 Danse Africaine – choir a capella
 2005 Song of Songs (Hebrew) – tenor and flute
 2002 String Quartet Nr 2 "Hashkivenu" – string quartet
 2002 Three Jewish Songs – soprano, oboe, violin, cello, accordion, percussion
 1999 Jerusalem (German, Hebrew, Dutch) – soprano, oboe, violin, viola, cello
 1999 Uncle Mendel’s Ukrainian Blues (Yiddish) - piano w/song
 1996 Wine, Love and Death (Hebrew text) – soprano, cello, accordion
 1994 The Golem - big band
 1991 Roses have thorns (W. Shakespeare) – choir
 1989 Two songs from "Dance of Death” (A. Strindberg) – soprano, baritone, cello and piano
 1987 Ma sh'mecha – choir

Vocal works
 2009 Biografiye - mezzo-soprano, clarinet, violin, viola, cello
 2009 Finf Yiddish Lieder - mezzo-soprano and harp
 2007 Kaddish - baritone, oboe, cello, harp
 2006 Danse Africaine - Four Langston Hughes Songs - choir a capella
 1984 Dibboek Suite - choir a capella

Music theatre
 2005 Hooglied (Song of Songs)
 2005 Thomas (based on a book by Guus Kuijer)
 1998 Een Golem
 1992 Joshe Kalb (J. Singer)
 1992 Esther (English and Hebrew)
 1990 De jongen die op reis ging om het griezelen te leren (text by Carel Alphenaar)
 1984 Dibboek (Judith Herzberg)

References
Frans van Rossum. "Hamburg, Jeff." Grove Music Online. Oxford Music Online. 26 March 2010

External links

American male composers
21st-century American composers
Musicians from Philadelphia
1956 births
Living people
University of Illinois alumni
Royal Conservatory of The Hague alumni
Pupils of Louis Andriessen
21st-century American male musicians